Peter Waite may refer to:
Peter Waite (philanthropist) (1834–1922), South Australian pastoralist and public benefactor
P. B. Waite (Peter Busby Waite, 1922–2020), Canadian historian
Pete Waite, American volleyball coach